James Roger Prior Angel (born February 7, 1941) is a British-born American astronomer. He is Regents Professor and Professor of Astronomy and Optical Sciences at the University of Arizona.

Education
He graduated from St Peter's College, Oxford, with a BA, in 1963, from California Institute of Technology, with an MA in 1966, and from the University of Oxford, with a D Phil, in 1967.

Career and research
He has taught at Columbia University.  He is a Fellow of the Royal Society. He was elected a Fellow of the American Academy of Arts and Sciences in 1990.

On August 23, 2012, Angel and his inventions were the subject of a story on NPR's Morning Edition.

Awards
 1976 Newton Lacy Pierce Prize in Astronomy
 1996 MacArthur Fellows Program
 2010 Kavli Prize for Astrophysics
 2016 National Inventors Hall of Fame

References

1941 births
Living people
American astronomers
Alumni of St Peter's College, Oxford
California Institute of Technology alumni
Columbia University faculty
University of Arizona faculty
MacArthur Fellows
Honorary Fellows of St Peter's College, Oxford
Fellows of the Royal Society
Fellows of the American Academy of Arts and Sciences
Kavli Prize laureates in Astrophysics